The 1910 Crewe by-election was held on 30 April 1910.  The by-election was held due to the death of the incumbent Liberal MP, James Tomkinson.  It was contested by the Liberal candidate Walter McLaren and the Unionist Liverpool ship-owner J.H. Welsford. The Liberal candidate retained the seat.

References

1910 elections in the United Kingdom
1910 in England
20th century in Cheshire
Crewe
By-elections to the Parliament of the United Kingdom in Cheshire constituencies